Duhok District  is a district of Duhok Governorate in Kurdistan Region, Iraq. The administrative centre is Duhok.

Subdistricts 
The district has the following sub-districts:
Duhok
Mangesh
Zawita

References

Districts of Dohuk Province